Rudy Dhaenens (10 April 1961 – 6 April 1998) was a Belgian professional road bicycle racer who is most famous for winning the World Cycling Championships in 1990 as a member of the Belgian national team.
 
Dhaenens excelled several times in the Paris–Roubaix classic race; finishing second in 1986 and third the following year. Dhaenens won the 1990 World Championship Road Race, held in Utsunomiya, Japan, ahead of Dirk De Wolf of Belgium and Gianni Bugno of Italy.  In 1992, Dhaenens was forced to stop his career because of heart problems. For a long time, he was in the service of the PDM cycling team, usually as tactical captain. Dhaenens was known for his calm, reserved attitude.

He died in 1998, at the age of 36, from head injuries sustained in a car accident in Aalst while driving to the finish of the Tour of Flanders bicycle race. From 1999 to 2007, the Grand Prix Rudy Dhaenens was held in his honour in late March, in Nevele, Belgium.

Career achievements

Major results

1981
2nd Ronde van Vlaanderen Beloften
1984
3rd Overall Tour de Luxembourg
4th Amstel Gold Race
8th Gent–Wevelgem
1985
1st Druivenkoers Overijse
3rd Gent–Wevelgem
3rd Road race, National Road Championships
5th Paris–Roubaix
10th Overall 4 Jours de Dunkerque
10th Overall Tour of Belgium
10th Paris–Tours
1986
1st Stage 11 Tour de France
2nd Paris–Roubaix
2nd De Kustpijl
6th Overall Tour de Luxembourg
1st Stage 1
7th Gent–Wevelgem
10th Overall 4 Jours de Dunkerque
1987
3rd Paris–Roubaix
4th Trofeo Laigueglia
6th Gent–Wevelgem
1988
4th Omloop Het Volk
8th Tour of Flanders
8th Gent–Wevelgem
1989
5th Grand Prix de la Libération (TTT)
7th Milan–San Remo
9th Overall Tirreno–Adriatico
10th Overall Ronde van Nederland
1990
1st  Road race, UCI Road World Championships
1st Stage 2a Vuelta a Asturias
2nd Tour of Flanders
2nd Druivenkoers Overijse
3rd Wincanton Classic
4th Liège–Bastogne–Liège
5th Tre Valli Varesine
8th GP des Amériques
9th Paris–Roubaix
10th Gent–Wevelgem

Tour de France record
 1985: 101st overall
 1986: 122nd overall; 1 stage win
 1988: 87th overall
 1990: 43rd overall

Notes

External links

Official Tour de France results for Rudy Dhaenens

1961 births
1998 deaths
People from Deinze
Belgian male cyclists
Belgian Tour de France stage winners
UCI Road World Champions (elite men)
Road incident deaths in Belgium
Cyclists from East Flanders